Stan Andrews (22 November 1912 – 4 October 1979) was a New Zealand cricketer. He played in six first-class matches for Canterbury between 1933 and 1936.

See also
 List of Canterbury representative cricketers

References

External links
 

1912 births
1979 deaths
New Zealand cricketers
Canterbury cricketers
Cricketers from Christchurch
South Island cricketers